Kuo Yen-wen (born 25 October 1988) is a Taiwanese baseball player for the Rakuten Monkeys of the Chinese Professional Baseball League (CPBL).

Career
He played in the Cincinnati Reds farm system in 2008–2009 and represented Taiwan at the 2006 World Junior Baseball Championship, 2008 Olympics, 2009 World Baseball Classic, 2013 World Baseball Classic, and 2014 Asian Games.

Kuo signed with the Cincinnati Reds as an international free agent in 2008. Kuo played for the Dayton Dragons and Billings Mustangs before being released on March 29, 2010. Kuo signed with the Lamigo Monkeys of the Chinese Professional Baseball League in 2011 and has played for the club through the 2020 season.

References

External links 
Baseball Reference – minors
 Taiwan Baseball Blog
 2008 Olympics
 World Baseball Classic

1988 births
2009 World Baseball Classic players
2013 World Baseball Classic players
2015 WBSC Premier12 players
Asian Games medalists in baseball
Asian Games silver medalists for Chinese Taipei
Baseball players at the 2008 Summer Olympics
Baseball players at the 2010 Asian Games
Baseball players at the 2014 Asian Games
Billings Mustangs players
Dayton Dragons players
Gulf Coast Reds players
Lamigo Monkeys players
Rakuten Monkeys players
Living people
Medalists at the 2010 Asian Games
Medalists at the 2014 Asian Games
Olympic baseball players of Taiwan
Baseball players from Tainan
Sarasota Reds players